Herqueville is a commune in the Eure department in northern France.

Population

See also
Communes of the Eure department

History
The local lords of the manor were the Maillet du Boulay family until 1934 when the estate was purchased by Louis Renault who is buried there.

References

Communes of Eure